Infatuator is the second studio album released by Silent Force.

Track listing
All songs were written by Alex Beyrodt and D.C. Cooper except tracks 3, 4, 5 and 12 by Beyrodt/Cooper/Hilgers/Röhre/Steinmetz, track 6 by Tipton/Halford/Downing and track 7 by Smolski (performed by the Belorussian State TV and Radio Orchestra).

 "Infatuator" – 4:46
 "Fall Into Oblivion" – 5:17
 "Hear Me Calling (Death by Fascination)" – 5:28 
 "Promised Land" – 5:03
 "We Must Use the Power" – 6:10
 "All Guns Blazing" (Judas Priest cover) – 3:27
 "Cena Libera" (Instrumental) – 0:26
 "Gladiator" – 4:36
 "The Blade" – 6:24
 "Last Time" - 4:48
 "World Aflame" - 5:26 
 "In Your Arms" - 6:05 
 "Northern Lights" (Instrumental) - 1:48

The Japanese version has "Overture" as track 1 and adds "Pain" as track 11.

Personnel
D.C. Cooper - vocals
Alex Beyrodt - guitars
Jürgen Steinmetz - bass
Torsten Röhre - keyboards
André Hilgers - drums

Guest musicians
 Inka Auhagen - female vocals on track 12

Production
 Produced by Alex Beyrodt 
 Engineered, mixed and mastered by Achim Koler at House of Music Studios
 Vocals produced by Victor Smolski, engineered by Ingo Czaikowski at VPS Studios

Notes

 Infatuator is a person who inspires foolish and unreasoning love or attraction.

2001 albums